New Zealand robin has been split into the following species:
 North Island robin, 	Petroica longipes
 South Island robin,  Petroica australis

Animal common name disambiguation pages